Holy Family University is a private Roman Catholic university in Philadelphia, Pennsylvania.  It was chartered in 1954 by the Congregation of the Sisters of the Holy Family of Nazareth. In addition to the main Torresdale campus in the northeastern section of the city, there is a satellite location in Newtown. There was an additional satellite location on Bristol Pike in Bensalem that has since been sold and has not held classes since Spring of 2018.

History
Holy Family University was founded in 1954 by the Sisters of the Holy Family of Nazareth as Holy Family Teacher Training School. During the early years, the college functioned as an affiliate of the Catholic University of America. The graduate programs in education were approved by the Pennsylvania Department of Education in March 1990, followed by the Nursing and Counseling Psychology programs in 1997, and the Accelerated Business Administration program in 2003. The graduate program in Criminal Justice was approved in 2007. The graduate program in TESOL and Literacy was approved in 2008. The doctoral program in Educational Leadership and Professional Studies was approved in 2010.

Holy Family is the youngest of the four Catholic universities in the city of Philadelphia; the others are Saint Joseph's, La Salle, and Chestnut Hill College.

Presidents 
 Sister Neomisia Rutkowska, CSFN, PhD (1954–1959)
 Sister Aloysius Sabacinska, CSFN, PhD (1959–1971)
 Sister Lillian Budny, CSFN, PhD (1971–1981)
 Sister Francesca Onley, CSFN, PhD (1981–2014)
 Sister Maureen McGarrity, CSFN, PhD (2014–2021)
 Anne M. Prisco, PhD (2021–present)

Academics
Holy Family University is divided into four schools: 
Arts and Sciences
Business Administration and Extended Learning
Education
Nursing and Allied Health Professions
 	
In January 2011, a doctoral program was introduced for those pursuing a Doctor of Education in Educational Leadership and Professional Studies.

Residence life 
There are three housing options: St. Joseph's Hall, Garden Residence, and the Stevenson Lane Residence.

Athletics
Holy Family University has 14 varsity sports teams, nine women's and five men's teams. Their nickname is the Tigers and their colors are blue and white. Sandra Michael has been the Assistant Vice President of Athletics since 1985. She oversees the University's 14 NCAA Division II sports. The teams at HFU compete in the Central Atlantic Collegiate Conference (CACC) which is composed of 14 colleges and universities located in Connecticut, Delaware, New Jersey, New York, and Pennsylvania. The CACC finished third nationally among Division II conferences.
The women's teams are basketball, cross-country running, track and field, lacrosse, soccer, softball, tennis, and volleyball. The women's basketball team are nine time CACC Champions, winning the crown in 2000, 2001, 2002, 2005, 2007, 2008, 2012, 2013, and 2015. They've appeared in the NCAA Tournament 11 times, including from 2004 to 2013 and in 2015.

Holy Family University men's teams consist of basketball, cross country, soccer, and track and field (indoor and outdoor). In the 2015–16 season, the men's basketball team finished with a 23–5 record, including a 17-2 conference record, to secure the number one seed in the CACC Tournament.

References

External links

Official athletics website

 
Universities and colleges in Philadelphia
Educational institutions established in 1954
Catholic universities and colleges in Pennsylvania
1954 establishments in Pennsylvania
Former women's universities and colleges in the United States
Northeast Philadelphia
Association of Catholic Colleges and Universities